Tropicario is a Finnish public aquarium, that was previously located in Hämeenlinna, Finland; due to the lack of visitors the park relocated to Helsinki, Finland in February 2007. The public aquarium is specialized in  snakes and lizards.
On their website they claim to have more Constrictor species than anywhere else in Scandinavia.

References

External links

Zoos in Finland
Buildings and structures in Helsinki